Syritta orientalis is a species of syrphid fly in the family Syrphidae.

Distribution
Oriental region, Australia, Micronesia, Hawaii.

References

Eristalinae
Diptera of Asia
Diptera of Australasia
Insects described in 1842